Olympia Press was a Paris-based publisher, launched in 1953 by Maurice Girodias as a rebranded version of the Obelisk Press he inherited from his father Jack Kahane. It published a mix of erotic fiction and avant-garde literary fiction, and is best known for issuing the first printed edition of Vladimir Nabokov's Lolita.

In its heyday during the mid-fifties Olympia Press specialized in books which could not be published (without legal action) in the English-speaking world. Early on, Girodias relied on the permissive attitudes of the French to publish sexually explicit books in both French and English. The French began to ban and seize the press's book in the late fifties.

Precisely 94 Olympia Press publications were promoted and packaged as "Traveller's Companion" books, usually with simple text-only covers, and each book in the series was numbered. The "Ophelia Press" line of erotica was far larger, using the same design, but pink covers instead of green.

Olympia Press was the first publisher willing to print William S. Burroughs's avant-garde, sexually explicit Naked Lunch, which soon became famous. Other notable works included J. P. Donleavy's The Ginger Man; Samuel Beckett's French trilogy Molloy, Malone Dies, and The Unnamable; Henry Miller's trilogy The Rosy Crucifixion, consisting of Sexus, Nexus and Plexus; A Tale of Satisfied Desire by Georges Bataille; Story of O by Pauline Réage; Terry Southern and Mason Hoffenberg's Candy; Alex Austin's The Blue Guitar and Eleanore; and a critical book on Scientology, Inside Scientology/Dianetics by Robert Kaufman. The South African poet Sinclair Beiles was an editor at the publisher. Other authors included Alexander Trocchi, Iris Owens (Harriet Daimler) and John Stevenson (Marcus Van Heller).

Girodias had troubled dealings with his authors including copyright issues. Nabokov was dissatisfied with the copyediting, assignment of copyright and the press's literary reputation. The press engaged in a long-running dispute over the rights to The Ginger Man ended with Donleavy's wife Mary buying out Girodias at what was intended to be a closed auction.

Grove Press in the U.S. would later print The Olympia Reader, a best-selling anthology containing material from some of Olympia's most popular works, including material by Burroughs, Miller, Trocchi and others. Another well-known collection was The Best of Olympia, first published by the Olympia Press in 1963 and reprinted by New English Library in 1966.

Other incarnations of the company, some with Girodias' support, emerged in Germany, Italy, and the United Kingdom. Olympia Press has been re-established and is currently operating out of Washington, London, and Frankfurt.

Works in the Traveller's Companion Series
 The 120 Days of Sodom by Marquis de Sade
 A Bedside Odyssey by Homer and Associates (pseudonym for Michael Gall)
 The Carnal Days of Helen Seferis by Alexander Trocchi

References

External links
Lust in the dust jackets: The Olympia Press and the Golden Age of Erotica at Salon.com

Book publishing companies of France
Erotic publishers
BDSM publishers
Mass media in Paris
Obscenity controversies in literature
Publishing companies established in 1953